Phorcus punctulatus, common name the punctate monodont, is a species of sea snail, a marine gastropod mollusk in the family Trochidae, the top snails.

Description
The size of the shell varies between 15 mm and 20 mm. The solid, imperforate shell has a conical shape. It is, deep purplish-brown or blackish, dotted with white, the dots sometimes forming spiral series, and always elongated in the direction of the spiral. The surface is nearly smooth, sometimes showing traces of spiral grooves, which are always visible on the young. The spire is conoid. The apex is generally eroded and orange-colored. The 6 whorls are convex. The body whorl is somewhat flattened or subconcave around the upper part. The base of the shell is convex, eroded and white in front of the aperture. The aperture is half-circular. The outer lip is not much thickened, edged with black, beautifully iridescent within, with amethystine tints. The columella is short, obtusely subdentate at the base, expanding above into a callus, which covers the axis and the umbilicus, or leaves a slight excavation or groove.

Distribution
This species occurs in the Atlantic Ocean off Senegal and Gambia.

References

 Lamarck ([J.-B. M.] de), 1815-1822 : Histoire naturelle des animaux sans vertèbres; Paris [vol. 5: Paris, Deterville/Verdière] [vol. 6 published by the Author] 7 vol. [I molluschi sono compresi nei vol. 5–7. Vol. 5 (Les Conchiferes): 612 pp. [25 luglio 1818]. Vol. 6 (1) (Suite): 343 pp. [1819]. Vol. 6 (2) (Suite): 232 pp. [1822]. Vol. 7: (Suite): 711 pp. 1822

External links
 To World Register of Marine Species
 

punctulatus
Gastropods described in 1822